Brodsky Synagogue may refer to the following Jewish synagogues:
 The Great Synagogue of Brody, established in 1742
 Brodsky Synagogue (Kyiv), financed by sugar magnate Lazar Brodsky
 Brodsky Synagogue (Odesa), founded by Jews from Brody.